Madison Mari Gesiotto Gilbert (née Gesiotto; born March 20, 1992) is an American attorney and politician. Gesiotto Gilbert won Miss Ohio USA 2014 and represented Ohio at that year's Miss USA. She was previously the author of a weekly column at The Washington Times titled "Millennial Mindset". 

Gesiotto Gilbert was the Republican nominee in the 2022 election in Ohio's 13th congressional district, losing narrowly to Democrat Emilia Sykes.

Early life and education
Gesiotto Gilbert attended Jackson Local Schools in Massillon, Ohio, and trained as a competitive figure skater in Lakewood, Ohio, at the Winterhurst Figure Skating Club. Gesiotto was coached by Carol Heiss. In 2010, she passed her gold tests in free skating and moves-in-the-field.

Gesiotto Gilbert graduated with honors from Ohio State University in 2014 with a Bachelor of Arts in political science. She graduated from Moritz College of Law at Ohio State in 2017 with a Juris Doctor degree.

Pageants

Gesiotto Gilbert represented Columbus at the Miss Ohio USA pageant in 2013, where she placed third runner-up to Kristin Smith. She praised pageant competition for the networking opportunities it provided.

Gesiotto represented Mid Ohio at the Miss Ohio USA pageant in 2014, where she was crowned Miss Ohio USA.

After winning Miss Ohio USA, Gesiotto Gilbert was featured on various television news outlets for her promotion of political awareness and her fundraising for Wounded Warrior Project.

She was also featured in a New York Times article profiling pageant consultant Bill Alverson.

Gesiotto Gilbert competed in the Miss USA 2014 competition on June 8, 2014, representing the state of Ohio.

Career
Gesiotto Gilbert was the author of a weekly column at The Washington Times titled "Millennial Mindset," which focused on various American political, policy, and legal issues. She previously anchored daily news briefings for The Washington Times.

Gesiotto Gilbert worked for Mitt Romney's 2012 presidential campaign and on the United States Senate Committee on Small Business and Entrepreneurship. As a law student at Moritz College of Law, Gesiotto Gilbert was a staff editor for The Ohio State Journal of Criminal Law.

In 2016, Gesiotto Gilbert endorsed Donald Trump in her Washington Times column. Gesiotto Gilbert described two instances in which she personally interacted with Trump, and described the reasons why she supported him for president. On December 14, 2020, Gesiotto Gilbert represented Ohio as a voter in the electoral college.

U.S. House campaign

Gesiotto Gilbert announced she was running for the United States House of Representatives in Ohio's 13th congressional district.

In November 2022, she lost the general election to Democratic nominee Emilia Sykes, an Ohio state representative.

Personal life
On February 22, 2021, Gesiotto married former NFL offensive tackle Marcus Gilbert.

References

External links
 

1992 births
2020 United States presidential electors
21st-century American women
American anti-abortion activists
American women columnists
American women journalists
Beauty queen-politicians
Candidates in the 2022 United States House of Representatives elections
Female models from Ohio
Living people
Miss USA 2014 delegates
Mitt Romney 2012 presidential campaign
Ohio Republicans
Ohio State University College of Arts and Sciences alumni
Ohio State University Moritz College of Law alumni
Politicians from Pittsburgh
The Washington Times people
American people of Italian descent